Myrtle Watkins (June 23, 1908 – November 10, 1968) was an American-born Mexican dancer, jazz and Latin American music singer, and actress, who came to be known in the United States and Mexico as Paquita Zarate.

Early life

Myrtle Watkins, born, Myrtle Dillard in Birmingham, Alabama, in June 1908 as the fifth child of Betty S. and Jasper L. Dillard. A 1910 Alabama Census confirms this information. Her father ran a grocery store (J. L. Dillard's Fish Co,) in Birmingham. Myrtle appears in Baltimore mid-1925, 17 years old as a dancer with her partner Yank Brunson. The Baltimore Afro-American newspaper described her as a local entertainer. Eventually, in late 1925, she joins Eddie Lemon's Stock Company, appearing at the Regent Theater's Who Dat? revue. Early in 1926, after Eddie Lemon left for Philadelphia, she remained at the Regent as part of the cast of Lew Peyton's Brownskin Vamps, where she appeared in her own solo number dancing the Charleston. During this time, Myrtle met and married local mechanic, Cephus Watkins; however, the marriage ended shortly afterwards. The following month, she was entertaining at the 'all-white' Folly Cabaret in East Baltimore, her Charleston had caught on immensely with its patrons. Weeks later, she departed for Boston with the Rarin' to Go revue. In 1928, she toured around the Boston area with the Bostonian Harmony Lads singing light blues, where she wrote in the Afro-American that she missed Baltimore.

Career

Arrival in Europe

During the winter of 1928, she joined the cast of the 2nd version of Lew Leslie's Blackbirds  during the Boston auditions. She eventually met Eddie Thompson, one of the show's leading dancers and part of the duo Worthy & Thompson. Myrtle and Eddie returned briefly to New York (February 4, 1929) to marry, another brief marriage. Blackbirds continued touring the Eastern US until May 31, when the troupe boarded the SS Ile de France for France. There they played three months the Moulin Rouge, before the French director renovated the Moulin into a cinema. The show opened on June 7 and was a sensation. Some of France's top stars attended, including Mistinguett and Maurice Chevalier. Adelaide Hall was the star attraction, and replacing Bill Bojangles Robinson in this version were, John Worthy and Ed Thompson. Blackbirds returned to New York to briefly tour the East Coast again in September, but its return coincided with the famous Wall-Street Crash and there was no work.

In April 1930, the United States Census takers arrived at the Thompson residence on 7th Avenue, where Mrs. Myrtle Thompson mentioned that she was employed as an entertainer with origins in Alabama. Weeks later, while engaged at Harlem's Lennox Club, Afro-American songwriter, Eugene Newton, whom had previously opened a Parisian nightclub in 1929, had plans of opening a new cabaret in the French capital, and organized Newton's Chocolate Revue as his main act. While Eddie Thompson was away touring across America, Myrtle returned to France the revue, arriving around April 26, the show was promptly reorganized with the help of Eugene Bullard and S.H. Dudley Jr. before preparing for its opening a week later. On May 1, the Comedy Club Revue, opened at Gene Newton's Le Comedy Club, where the production ran for several weeks before the establishment was shut down by French authorities. On the 24th, the cast moved over to Eugene Bullard's Embassy Club as, Revue Noire: Hot Stuff, featuring headliners Louis Cole, Elisabeth Welch, Lillian Brown and comic Snow Fisher. On May 31, Louis Cole, Elisabeth Welch, Myrtle Watkins and Senegalese Folies-Bergere star, Féral Benga were entertaining at the Enfants-Terribles Restaurant, quickly become a popular attraction. On June 23, an artistic gala was held at the Enfants-Terribles, Myrtle performing alongside Lucienne Boyer, Alina de Silva, the Irving Sisters, Charpini and Brancato, M. Pisella to the sound of Pance Lowry's orchestra. For the remainder of the summer, Myrtle teamed up with Elisabeth Welch appearing at the famous supper club, Chez Florence in long orange satin gowns designed by Jean Patou, lifting their skirts to reveal their long legs as they danced. A while later, she appeared again at the Embassy with the show Ebony Follies. By late 1930, afternmost of the cast at the Embassy had already returned to America, Myrtle began appearing the Champs-Élysées Nightclub, but eventually soon made her way southwest for Spain.

Spain (1930–33)

Myrtle probably arrived in Spain that winter, as she opened in Madrid on January 6, 1931, with her Red Hot Coals Jazz Orchestra at the Lido de Madrid Cabaret (underneath the Teatro Alcázar) located on Calle de Alcalá 20. Her arrival was probably organized by Spanish author and lyricist, Alvaro Retana, who was known for introducing black jazz entertainers into Spain. Retana mentioned in his memoirs later that Mytle performed semi-nude, imitating the Spanish dancer Carmen Tortola Valencia, under the name Perla de Oriente. On March 7, her contract ended at the Lido and Myrtle traveled south to Seville's Casino del Exposicion, where she was entertaining when the Spanish monarchy ended on April 14 as Niceto Alcalá-Zamora y Torres was declared the president and former King Alfonso XIII abdicated peacefully and boarded a train to France for exile. In May, she returned triumphantly to Madrid's Lido as celebrations filled the streets. On June 6, she was entertaining at the Sala Metropolitano, three days later she moved over to the Ideals-Rosales open-air cabaret performing with Carlos VG Flores' Orchestra until July 6. It was during this engagement she was introduced to Argentine singer-guitarist Alfredo Marino (born January 30, 1904) and his partner, Hector Morel. Once her contract ended at the Ideal-Rosales, Myrtle joined the duo on a tour across Spain's northern coast in cities such as Bilbao, Oviedo and San Sebastián. Upon returning to Madrid on July 22, she appeared at the Casanova en Stambul cabaret alongside Manuel Pizarro's Argentina Orchestra for three days. On August 11, Myrtle appeared at the Dancing Retiro, a nightclub located in Madrid's lush Parque del Buen Retiro alongside popular Afro-American bandleader Harry Flemming and his orchestra. Two days later, she reunited with Morel & Marino and together they performed at the Teatro Alkazar in a magnificent stage show for six weeks.

On October 2, Myrtle appeared at the Circo Price for three days before boarding a train to Barcelona. Not long after arriving, she made several appearances on Spanish radio and recording several songs for the Compañía del Gramófono-Barcelona. None of the recordings seem to have survived, however she was noted as performing El Manisero and other popular Cuban rumbas and Spanish pasodoble toreros around this time. On the 27th, together with Afro-American dancer, Josephine Wynn (who she met months earlier at the Retiro) opened at the popular Eden Concert musichall, where they performed a successful month. On November 8, Myrtle participated in the Fiesta Parisina at the Eden Concert alongside, Afro-Uruguayan singer Oscar Rorra, known under stage name: Caruso Negro. On the 17th, at the Teatro Novedades, she performed in a benefit for Barcelona's firefighters. On November 21, Myrtle participated in an eight-day variety spectacle held at the Circo Barcelonés, alongside some Spain's top entertainers. On December 16, Myrtle appeared with Afro-American dancer Jimmy Holmes at the Buena Sombra cabaret until February 3.

From February 28 until March 16, 1932, she performed with Afro-American bandleader Levi Wine's Revista Americana, which included popular Spanish cabaret artist, Bella Dorita, at the Ba-Ta-Clan in Valencia. Returning to Madrid a week later and establishing a residence at the Hotel Florida, on March 24 (or April 4), she opened at Lido de Madrid with Louis Douglas's company, where they were engaged throughout the month. Afterhours, Myrtle would drive over to the Teatro Fuencarral, where she also appeared in Folkoricos Arrevistados, alongside Argentinean actress Perlita Greco and Rosarillo de Triana. Early May, while Louis Douglas recovered in a local hospital with stomach pains, together with dancer, Scrappy Jones, he reorganized the company from his bed. On May 21, Modern Melodies opened at the Avenida Cinema dancing in front of the band in a costume with red feathers swinging on her backside. One visiting journalist for the Afro-American described her as the Josephine Baker of Spain: "Miss Watkins is a very good dancer, with plenty of pep, and a pretty shapely figure. She is making conquests in high society and on her string is the marquis of one of Spain's bluest blue bloods. She lives at the Hotel Florida, one of the best hotels in the city, has a fine roadster, records for Spanish gramophone and radio, and entertains at one of the leading cabarets." The revue closed on June 16 and Louis Douglas took the company over to another theater. It's unknown if Myrtle joined them. On July 14, Myrtle and Josephine Wynn traveled to the city of Zaragoza to appear for three weeks at the Florida Bar. On October 4, Spanish newspapers reported that an upcoming film, titled Movietone 1933, was under preparation at a Madrid film studio. The film was to feature Perlita Greco, Myrtle, Scrappy Jones and several other Spanish actors. However it's unknown whether the film actually materialized. On the 13th, Myrtle was in the city of Huesca, appearing at the Cine Odeon with Cuban saxophonist, El Negro Aquilino and his band. In December, Louis Douglas and his troupe departed for what would be a failed Italian Tour. It's not known whether Myrtle actually accompanied him, as she disappears for several months. She may have probably spent this time appearing in various Spanish provinces.

On January 10, 1933, Myrtle resurfaced in Andalucia, appearing at Seville's Teatro del Duque. On the 21st, she was engaged at the Teatro Mora in the nearby city of Huelva. A while later, on March 9, she appeared back in Seville at the Pathe Cinema for four days. In June 1933, she was touring in Belgium with the bandleader Robert de Kers. While there, she recorded a new song, Lonely Brown Rose (which was also translated to French as Rose Creole) and appeared on the front of Belgian magazines. Returning to Spain during the fall, she opened on September 15 at Barcelona's Teatro Romea in Max Guido's Jazz Show revue for two magnificent weeks. On October 7, she moved over to the glamorous Pompeya Musichall where she danced all evening for a month, and then after midnight would run down the street and sing at the popular Hollywood nightclub which would be broadcast floorshows over the radio. There at the Hollywood, she performed alongside her latest rival, 17 year old Elsie Bayron, who although been born in Puerto Rico, had grown up in Harlem and was showcasing her repertoire from the Savoy Ballroom everynight in Barcelona's popular nightclubs. On November 17, Myrtle appeared at the exclusive Casa Llibre Tea Rooms singing for some of Spain's elite. That winter, Myrtle paired up with Afro-American pianist Tommy Puss Chase and his band for a tour of the southern coast of France.  "Myrtle Watkins was a very enterprising girl, always had some kind of band with her, and was a very good looking and talented singer and dancer." They appeared in Cannes, Nice and ended in Monaco during the Rallye Monte Carlo.

European tour (1934–36)

On March 11, 1934, Ada Bricktop Smith postponed the opening of her new Parisian nightclub, Monico's, until Myrtle arrived, advertised her as "the world’s most fascinating entertainer". After three months, on June 2, she moved on to the Basque Bar with entertainer Evelyn Dove. On July 2, Myrtle debuted in London's Granada Theater ‘all-colored’ revue, Black Scandals. The show ran for a successful week. The films shown that week on the manager's weekly report states that both films were rather weak, and had it not been for the stage show, the takings would have been down. On July 14, for the remainder of the month, newspapers reported that Myrtle returned home to Spain to handle affairs. On August 25, she was in The Netherlands, dancing in The Hague at the popular Palais de Danse cabaret with French singer, Marie Dubas. On November 3, Myrtle was appearing at London's Cafe Anglais with Louis Simmonds' Orchestra.

On January 31, 1935, she returned to Paris, appearing at the popular Cuban-themed Melody-Bar with the Afro-American tenor, Opal Cooper. While there, she learned her estranged husband Eddie was ill with stomach cancer and had to halt his career while recovering in hospital. In March, she left for Berlin to appear in a film before returning in May, appearing at the Boeuf Sur Le Toit with Leon Abbey's orchestra. While touring Belgium again during the late summer, Leon Abbey arranged for Myrtle to appear with his orchestra for six months in Bombay, India. After boarding a ship in Venice, they arrived in Bombay early October, where it was quickly realized they didn't have the proper work permits. Later joined by Opal Cooper, the group appeared at the Taj Mahal Hotel and Green's Ballroom next door with much success. By December, however, Myrtle was laid low by a terrible bout of malaria. During her stay, she was introduced to a handsome Malaysian cricket player, Lall Singh, who was smitten with this new popular jazz artist in India. Lall Singh was born, December 16, 1909, into the affluent Gill Jat family of Malaya, who had migrated there from India 3 generations before. He was the youngest of 3 sons, the eldest being Santha Singh Gill and middle brother being Bishen Singh Gill. All three brothers studied at the prestigious Victoria Institute in Kuala Lumpur. Being highly passionate to play cricket at the highest possible level, he convinced his mother to allow and sponsor him to play cricket in India. The family accordingly approached Maharajah Patiala, Bhupindar Singh who was known to the family. Maharajah Bhupindir Singh, himself a good cricketer and lover of the game, advised the family to send Lall Singh to Patiala to play in his team, Maharajah Patiala XI, which was led by the Maharajah himself. He reached Patiala in 1931 and in the company of Maharajah Bupindar Singh developed his lifelong love for the 'Patiala Peg'. The following year, Lall was selected for India's inaugural tour to England. In 1934–35, Lall Singh represented Hindus in the Bombay Quadrangular tournament and South Punjab in the inaugural Ranji Trophy. Maharajah Bhupindar Singh was very fond of Lall and this closeness to the Maharajah gave rise to many enemies, as a result of which, there was an attempt on the life of Lall Singh in 1936. He was seriously injured but survived.

By March 1936, after recovery, with the permission of Maharajah Bhupindar Singh, Lall took a short break from cricket and returned to Europe with Myrtle, now working as her theatrical agent. Soon after, the couple quickly wed and Myrtle began wearing a sari and practicing Sikhism alongside her new husband. Around this time, her former husband in Harlem died of Stomach Cancer. Throughout the spring, Myrtle appeared in Egypt and Greece. In June, she arrived in Turkey, performing at Istanbul's Taksim Bahcesi club (June 3–19), located on Taksim Square. After travelling across Bulgaria, Romania and Yugoslavia, Myrtle arrived in Czechoslovakia to perform at Prague's Savarin Cabaret (October 1–2) before moving on to Hungary. On November 1, Amerika Revu Kultura opened at Budapest's famous Arizona Csodabár, one of the most celebrated nightclubs in the Hungarian capital. While guests danced on the rotating dance floor and chorus girls were perched on mechanical chandeliers that descended from the ceiling, Myrtle was one of the leading "African" stars of this multicultural show. After the revue closed, Myrtle went over to the Negresco Café for the remainder of the winter (December 2-January 5).

Transition into Paquita (1937–40)

Unable to return home to Spain, due to the outbreak of the Spanish Civil War, she instead traveled back to Paris the spring of 1937 in time for the Exposition Internationale, appearing at Le Grand Jeu Cabaret and the George V Restaurant where she held live-radio broadcasts and performed for every visiting dignitary and royalty at the Exposition. She was soon accompanied by Samuel Bonifacio Zarate, a Mexican violinist popular among French audiences for his virtuoso violin skills. He worked with Carlos Chávez's Sinfónica de Mexico at the Palacio de Bellas Artes in Mexico City and graduated from the Mexican National Conservatory, where he was a disciple of Luis G. Saloma. He earned a scholarship from the Mexican government and studied in Paris at the l'Ecole Normale Superieur (1932–37). Earlier in the spring, he won the first prize at the International Violin Competition. To make ends meet, he entertained whenever possible, often with the Mexican-American Vedette, Reva Reyes. On one occasion, he was hired to entertain royalty at the George V restaurant. There he met Myrtle, who soon took on the name Paquita, and quickly became a musical team. In September, they moved over to the Pavillon-Elysees and spent the winter at the Villa d'Este cabaret. In June 1938, Adelaide Hall left for London, leaving behind her cabaret, the Big Apple Club. Myrtle became the club's main attraction while Bricktop ran the finances of the club. But Bricktop was no good in keeping the accounts straight, her temper was even worse, and soon the cabaret shut down that winter. Before the club fell apart, Myrtle returned to the Villa d'Este in September. In December, she appeared in Harlem au Coliseum at the Paris-Coliseum alongside other artists, such as her new partner Samuel Zarate and Zaidee Jackson. She later opened at the new Park-Lane Club with Louis Armstrong & his Cuban American orchestra. During the summer of 1939, while Myrtle and Zarate toured the Baltic coast, where her German films did so well, when the atmosphere suddenly grew dark in Europe. Posters appeared across everywhere "Because of the aggressive attitude of the German government, France and the United Kingdom has declared a general mobilization." In August, she was in Poland appearing on Radio-Warsaw. A few weeks later, Polish musician, Stanley Laudan invited Myrtle to, La Bagatelle, his club in Katowice. On September 1, World War II started as Nazi troops quickly seized Poland. As Poland underwent military mobilization to defend itself, she was able to get documents to flee back to Paris. Upon arriving, Lall decided to renew his cricket contract and return to Malaysia and at some point couple probably decided to divorce in November. Soon as danger was at her doorstep again as the Germans turned their attentions on France early 1940.

India (1941–43)

Danger was again at their doorstep as the Germans turned their attentions on France early 1940, Paquita and Zarate departed for a Middle Eastern tour, travelling across Egypt and Iraq during the early years of the war. By the summer of 1941, they made their way into India, with major success in Lahore's  Hotel as well as Bombay's Taj Mahal and Green's Hotels. This attracted the attention from Calcutta's Grand Hotel which housed the popular American jazz musician, Teddy Weatherford, whom she met briefly in 1937 and who had just arrived from Ceylon and was now the music director of the hotel's ballroom. In November, the Grand Ballroom floor-show featured Myrtle dancing and singing Latin American numbers. She was soon broadcast over Indian radio and Myrtle recorded the numbers from the show with the Indian Columbia records, so the audience could enjoy her performance at home. In January 1942, Japanese troops occupied Kuala Lumpur. Lall Singh was seized and placed in a work camp with his brother, BS Gill (who eventually died) until the country was liberated in August 1945. Starting in Calcutta, the Quit India movement swept across the country, with protesters demanding the creation of an independent India. Myrtle obtained an American passport during the summer with plans of leaving the country before things got too bad. Soon the bliss of India was gone when Japanese planes were bombing Calcutta in early 1943. The Grand Hotel became flooded with soldiers, and her shows were used to boost troop morale.

Mexico and return to the United States (1944–49)

Decided it might be time to move on, Paquita and Zarate now newly engaged, boarded the USS Hermitage, accompanied with Polish refugees, for California, arriving in San Pedro during the summer of 1943. California was stirring with chaos as the Zoot Suit Riots broke out across the West Coast. Arriving in Los Angeles, the couple traveled south to Mexico to Zarate's hometown, El Oro de Hidalgo to spend times with his numerous relatives. After a while in Mexico, they returned to Los Angeles, because it offered more opportunities in the entertainment field. Paquita also began informing everyone that she was an Indian princess of the Brahmin caste sent by her parents to study in Europe, a story probably developed to prevent racial issues she would have faced as an African-American artist. On January 6, 1944, the couple married quietly in Seattle. 'Zarate & Paquita' took their show across the Western & Southwestern United States, Hawaii, Alaska and Mexico. They played with big names across the US, including Liberace. They were regular entertainers around Reno, Salt Lake City, San Jose and Eugene, Oregon. They soon purchased a home in Evanston, Wyoming, along Interstate-80 near Salt Lake City, with access to Utah, Nevada and California. During the summer of 1947, they performed at the Bastille Day celebrations in Reno for the French Consul. Their concerts usually began with Zarate playing classical violin and viola numbers in the first half and in the second half when Paquita would join Zarate on drums, dancing in a frenzy dressed in elegant gowns and singing songs from around the world in five different languages. With such a hectic touring schedule, it seems they bothered to take too many breaks. Despite Zarate often returning home to Mexico to visit relatives, it doesn't seem as if Paquita returned to Alabama to see any family; or even visit Detroit to attend her father's funeral in 1946.

Later career and death (1952–68)

In 1952, Zarate filed for American neutrality so could establish himself more in the United States. Zarate also took up contracts from numerous recording companies, particularly Northwestern. Zarate and Paquita's records sold well across the Western United States. Later on, Zarate opened his own music recording company, ZARPAC, based in their Los Angeles home, which also contained a recording studio. They recorded more than before, nearly a dozen recordings a year and appeared on American radio and television. They became known in performing foreign songs and also experimented in different genres, such as Calypso, which had become popular during the early-1950s. Sometime around 1953, while performing in Chicago, a strong wind damaged their home in Evanston, Wyoming. Cancelling their appearance, they traveled to California and bought a house in Sun Valley, confining their travels to the West Coast. In 1958, they released a religious album, each song dedicated to different religions across the world such as Hinduism, Christianity, and Islam. In 1959, they performed in a year-long spectacle at the Lamplighter Lounge in Corvallis, Oregon.

By 1957, they began frequently touring the central Oregon coast under contract to one of the largest nightclubs in Portland. The owner of a new motel and lounge complex in Depoe Bay, Oregon, wanted them to entertain there on a part-time basis. On their first visit, Zarate saw a 'For-Sale' sign on two concrete oxen standing outside a small green house called "Trails End" on six acres of brushland between Lincoln City and Depoe Bay. He suggested they buy it, but Paquita suggested otherwise, "Yes, here in the middle of nowhere." The sign was still there upon their second visit and Zarate and Paquita bought the property in 1959. They built a new house and had the oxen separated and placed on either end of the driveway that loops off Highway 101. They built a studio, so Zarate could teach violin, guitar, piano, flute and organ - instruments he had mastered over the years. Paquita gave lessons in dance and numerous languages. There was also an adjoining restaurant, The Gingerbread House, providing traditional Mexican and Indian cuisine; children were permitted without charge to encourage more students and guests. A number of students enrolled at the Happy Village Cultural Center.

But the institution was not profitable, especially as Paquita became too involved with the children and it hurt her health, which was already debilitated by diabetes according to Zarate. To continue running things, they made numerous appearances over the years at the popular Amato's Supper Club and at the King Surf Beach Resort's Pagan Hut restaurant. Zarate performed at weddings across Oregon and they both entertained at gatherings hosted by the elite of the west coast. This helped bring money to continue running things back at their small estate. During the spring of 1962, in Wecoma Beach (now Lincoln City) they appeared in an International Music Recital where they presented their varied repertoires of dances and songs in numerous languages and instruments. Their stage appearances became very minimal for many years afterwards, except for the annual appearances in Mexico during the spring and winter. After 1965, they also began appearing annually at the Salishan Bar & Grill. Paquita watched as cars went faster and faster by their home, and it troubled her to think that people were in such a hurry. She wanted to give them a place where they could pull over for a few minutes and "give their souls a chance to catch up with them." Zarate wanted to wait until her health improved, so they could build it together. Myrtle "Paquita" Zarate died on November 10, 1968, of diabetic complications. Zarate immediately built a small white chapel on the property among the pines he planted in her honor, and hardly left except to visit relatives in Mexico during the winter. The Fine Arts School continued running, but doesn't seem to have drawn many students as they had before her death. Samuel Zarate continued performing across the Oregon and Mexico until his death in 1997.

References

External links
 http://zarate-and-paquita.blogspot.com/2016/07/myrtle-watkins-paquita-zarate.html
 http://www.tajmahalfoxtrot.com/?p=1395
 http://www.tajmahalfoxtrot.com/?p=2430
 https://www.youtube.com/watch?v=hZMp8LJsyPY

1908 births
1968 deaths
20th-century American actresses
20th-century Spanish actresses
20th-century Mexican actresses
Actresses from Massachusetts
Actresses from Boston
African-American actresses
African-American female dancers
American female dancers
American expatriates in Spain
African-American dancers
20th-century African-American women singers
Music hall performers
Harlem Renaissance
Traditional pop music singers
Vaudeville performers
American emigrants to France
American emigrants to Spain
20th-century American singers
People from Lincoln County, Oregon
Dancers from Alabama
Dancers from Oregon
Dancers from Massachusetts
20th-century American women singers
People from Evanston, Wyoming
People from Birmingham, Alabama
20th-century American dancers